Govind Parmar is an Indian politician and member of the Bharatiya Janata Party. Parmar is a member of the Madhya Pradesh Legislative Assembly from the Tarana constituency in Ujjain district.

On 13 April 2017, Parmar and his son were accused of assaulting a female toll plaza worker which the police had not taken action against. Almost a month later, a judge ordered a probe into the incident.

References 

People from Ujjain
Bharatiya Janata Party politicians from Madhya Pradesh
Madhya Pradesh MLAs 1990–1992
Living people
21st-century Indian politicians
Year of birth missing (living people)